Club Deportivo Alcalá is a Spanish football team based in Alcalá de Guadaira, in the autonomous community of Andalusia. Founded in 1945 it plays in División de Honor Andaluza - Group 1, and plays home games at Nuevo Estadio Ciudad de Alcalá, with a capacity of 2,261 seaters. CD Alcala debuted in the Second Division B of Spain's in 2004–05. They got to play 5 years in that division.

History 
The club was founded on October 13, 1945, as a result of the efforts by a group of football fans. Among them was Julio Garcia, who was actually the one who founded the club. 

In January 2019 Federico Martínez Gamez became the club's new head coach.

Season to season

{|
|valign="top" width=0%|

5 seasons in Segunda División B
19 seasons in Tercera División

References

External links
Official website 
Futbolme team profile 

Football clubs in Andalusia
Association football clubs established in 1944
1944 establishments in Spain
Province of Seville